High Seas Trader is a 1995 naval business simulation video game. The player runs trade routes, fends off pirates, collects artifacts and offers transport to fellow countrymen in need, all for the sake of climbing up the game's ranking ladder, which in turn allows the player to buy bigger ships, more firepower and larger cargo holds to progress more quickly in the ranks.

Gameplay
The game is set in the year 1650. The player starts out with the most basic ship (Fluyt) and 5,000 (5k) gold.

Nations
The player chooses a nation at the beginning of the game. Consequences lie in the relations between nations; which nations declare war/peace will determine which ports the player can access at given times, and which ships will open fire on them at sea. The options are:

Dutch
English
French
Portuguese
Spanish

Ships
Fluyt
Crew: 100
Cargohold: 300 tons
Firepower: 4 banks of 1 cannon each
Price: 4k gold
Corvette
Crew: 100
Cargohold: 150 tons
Firepower: 4 banks of 2 cannon each
Price: 8k gold
Merchant
Crew: 200
Cargohold: 500 tons
Price: 14k gold
Frigate
Crew: 200
Cargohold: 350 tons
Firepower: 4 banks of 4 cannon each
Price: 16k gold
East Indiaman
Crew: 250
Cargohold: 700 tons
Price: 21k gold
Fourth rate
Crew: 300
Cargohold: 600 tons
Firepower: 4 banks of 8 cannon each
Price: 27k gold

Titles
Peddler (Fluyt and Corvette)
Journeyman (Merchant and Frigate)
Tradesman (East Indianman and Fourth rate, Small estate – 2 treasures max) 
Merchant (Medium estate – 4 treasures max)
Master Merchant (Large estate – 6 treasures max)
Viscount (end of the game)

Guild ladder
Climbing up the ladder ranks grants the player titles, access to bigger ships, and bigger estates. The player can gather points in the categories, then cash them in for a title. Once they are granted a title, the points in the categories reset, allowing them to do it all over.

Ammo
Round (Long-range ammunition)
Chain (Short-range ammunition, tears up sails leaving enemy ships dead in the water)
Grape (Short-range ammunition, leaves big holes in attacking ships, akin to firing a huge shotgun filled with grape-sized balls of steel. Note: The actual purpose of grapeshot was to reduce the enemy crew.)

Cannons
Swivel-gun (0.3t)
Saker (1.0t)
Demi-culverin (1.2t)
Culverin (2.0t)
Demi-cannon (2.5t)
Cannon (3.0t)

Banks
Players can place money in banks for safekeeping. This is useful if they ever lose a battle at sea, as they can start over with their savings. However, the savings are reduced by the interest rate over time, as the player must pay for the security.

Reception
High Seas Trader received mixed or average reviews. The game was reviewed in 1995 in Dragon #221 by John Brunkhart in the "Eye of the Monitor" column. Brunkhart gave the game 2 out of 5 stars.

Next Generation reviewed the PC version of the game, rating it three stars out of five, and stated that "Although the subject material may be a little too dry for some gamers, High Seas Trader is definitely a must for strategy fans."

Reviews
CU Amiga (Jun, 1995)
Power Play (Jul, 1995)
Amiga Format (Jun, 1995)
Amiga Joker (May, 1995)
Amiga Computing (Jul, 1995)
All Game Guide (1995)
Amiga Power (Jul, 1995)

See also
Sid Meier's Pirates! (1987)

References

External links

1995 video games
Amiga games
DOS games
Naval video games
Strategy video games
Trade simulation games
Video games about pirates
Video games developed in the United Kingdom
Video games set in the 17th century
Impressions Games games
Single-player video games